Sitte may refer to:

Places
 Sitte, Kobyaysky District, Sakha Republic,  a selo in Mukhuchunsky Rural Okrug of Kobyaysky District of the Sakha Republic
 Sitte (river), Russia

Peoplewith the surname
 Camillo Sitte (1843–1903), Austrian architect, painter and city planning theoretician
 Kurt Sitte (1910–1993), German nuclear physicist
 Margaret Sitte, American politician
 Petra Sitte (born 1960), German politician
 Willi Sitte  (1921-2013), German painter

See also
 Sittee River, a river in Belize